Galway United Football Club (Irish: Cumann Peile Ghaillimh Aontaithe) is an Irish association football club based in Galway. They play in the League of Ireland First Division.
They were founded as Galway Rovers F.C. during the 1930s. They made their League of Ireland debut in 1977–78 and changed their name to Galway United in 1981–82. After suffering financial difficulties, the club dropped out of the League of Ireland after the 2011 season but in 2014 Galway United returned initially playing as Galway F.C. for a season.

History

Galway Rovers
Galway United F.C. were founded as Galway Rovers F.C. in the Claddagh district of Galway. The club's website claims the club was founded in 1937. However, according to a Galway Advertiser report, the club was active in 1933, winning a local junior competition known as the Celtic Shield. The first recorded mention of a Rovers team dates back to a meeting at 28 Dominick Street on 20 September 1898 but it's not known if this was related to the future Rovers club  By 1937 Rovers were fielding youth teams as well as a junior side. Rovers won the Connacht Junior Cup in 1958 and they also played in the Western League. Rovers first gained national attention when they were invited to play in the 1976–77 League of Ireland Cup. In 1977–78 they made their debut in the League of Ireland. They played their first League of Ireland game on 28 August 1977 at Terryland Park against St. Patrick's Athletic. Eamonn Deacy scored Rovers' first League of Ireland goal on 2 October 1977. In 1980–81 Rovers reached the final of the League of Ireland Cup, but lost on penalties to Dundalk.

1980s
In the 1981–82 season, Galway Rovers changed their name to Galway United and under their new name, the club reached two cup finals in successive seasons. United made their first appearance in an FAI Cup final in 1984–85 but lost 1–0 to Shamrock Rovers. In 1985–86 United became founder members of the League of Ireland Premier Division and finished second behind Shamrock Rovers in the new division's inaugural season. In 1985–86 United won its first major trophy after defeating Dundalk 2–0 in the League of Ireland Cup final. Denis Bonner and Paul McGee scored the vital goals.

1990s
Galway United made a good start to the 1990s, winning their first FAI Cup and qualifying for Europe for a third time. In the 1990–91 FAI Cup final at Lansdowne Road, United defeated Shamrock Rovers 1–0. With five minutes to go on the clock, captain Johnny Glynn scored a late goal. In 1991–92 United was relegated to the First Division for the first time, but the following season, 1992–93, they returned to the Premier Division after winning the First Division title and the League of Ireland First Division Shield. The club finished 1993-94 in a respectable 3rd place.

In 1995–96 United were relegated for a second time. In 1996–97 United won the League of Ireland Cup defeating Cork City 4-2 over two legs along with the First Division Shield. It was the second time United had won both trophies.

United remained in the First Division until 1998–99 when, under Don O'Riordan, they were promoted to the Premier Division after finishing as runners-up in the First Division to Drogheda United.

2000s
The 2000s were not a successful decade for Galway United. Ten different managers took charge of United during this era and, between them, they managed to win just one amateur trophy, the 2007–08 Connacht Senior Cup. In 2001–02 United were relegated to the League of Ireland First Division and they did not return to the Premier Division until 2007
 In April 2005 United appointed Nick Leeson as commercial manager. He then became general manager in late November 2005 and by July 2007 he had become the club's CEO. By the end of the decade United were joined in the League of Ireland by two other Galway–based teams, Mervue United and Salthill Devon.

2010s
By 2010 Galway United had debts estimated to be between €35,000 and €70,000. In 2011, after Darra Hislop resigned as CEO, the Galway United board of directors and the Galway United Supporters Trust ("GUST"), which had been established in 2001, came to an agreement under which the latter group took over financial responsibility for the club and the day-to-day running of the team. However, after the 2011 League of Ireland Premier Division season, in which Galway United lost 32 out of 36 games, this arrangement broke down. In December 2011 it was announced that Galway United would not be competing in the 2012 League of Ireland First Division season. Meanwhile, GUST unsuccessfully applied to join the League of Ireland as an independent club and continued to support the Galway United team playing in the League of Ireland U19 Division.

In 2012 a report commissioned by the Football Association of Ireland (FAI) recommended that Galway city and County Galway should be represented in the League of Ireland by a single club or team based at Eamonn Deacy Park. The O'Connor Report also recommended that GUST, Salthill Devon, Mervue United and the Galway Football Association, should work together to form such a club. GUST was reluctant to support this "merger" but eventually agreed.

Following the conclusion of the 2013 season, both Mervue United and Salthill Devon withdrew from the League of Ireland First Division to make way for a team known as Galway F.C. A new board of directors was established featuring representatives from GUST, Salthill Devon, Mervue United and the GFA. In 2014 Galway played in the First Division and after finishing third and winning a play-off they gained promotion to the 2015 League of Ireland Premier Division. Before the start of the season Galway F.C. was renamed Galway United. In 2015 the club had the opportunity to record a third League of Ireland Cup success when they played St. Patrick's Athletic in the final at Eamonn Deacy Park, however they lost the tie 4-3 in a penalty shoot out following a scoreless draw.

On 27 October 2017, Galway United were relegated to the League of Ireland First Division after a 4–3 loss to Dundalk in their final game of the 2017 League of Ireland Premier Division at Eamonn Deacy Park. Despite finishing the 2017 season in 10th place, a normally safe position, a change in league format ahead of the 2018 season meant that this was not enough for the club to retain its place in the top flight.

It was announced on the 30th of March 2022, that the Comer Brothers would be taking majority ownership of the club. Following a vote of the supporters trust, 82% backed the move which would see the Comers take an 85% ownership stake in the club. They have announced an initial influx of half a million euro into the club with ambitions to take the club back to the Premier Division.

Grounds
Galway United's principal home ground is Eamonn Deacy Park, previously known as Terryland Park. In 1993 while Terryland Park underwent redevelopment, Galway United played their matches at the Galway Sportsgrounds and at Crowley Park. In 1985 Galway United also played a home European game at the Sportsgrounds. On the other two occasions United qualified for Europe they played their home games at the home grounds of Carraroe GAA and Ballinderreen GAA.

Personnel

Current squad

Out on loan

Technical staff

Management

European record

Overview

Matches

Shirt sponsors and manufacturers

Gallery

Notable former players

Republic of Ireland senior internationals

League of Ireland XI representatives

Republic of Ireland U23 internationals
  Seamus Conneely
  Shane Guthrie
  Stephen O'Donnell
  Jay O'Shea
Republic of Ireland U21 internationals

Republic of Ireland U19 internationals
  Mick Cooke
  Laurence Gaughan
  John Russell

Republic of Ireland U18 internationals
  Ryan Casey
  Donal Higgins
  Don O'Riordan
  Alex Murphy
Other senior internationals

Managerial history

Honours
League of Ireland Premier Division
Runners Up: 1985–86: 1
FAI Cup
Winners: 1990–91: 1
Runners Up: 1984–85: 1
League of Ireland Cup
Winners: 1985–86, 1996–97: 2
Runners Up: 1979–80, 2015: 2
League of Ireland First Division
Winners: 1992–93: 1
Runners Up: 1998–99:, 2021 2
League of Ireland First Division Shield: 2
Winners: 1992–93, 1996–97: 2
Connacht Senior League
Winners: 1984–85, 1985–86, 1987–88: 3
Runners Up: 1986–87, 1993–94: 2
Connacht Senior Cup
Winners: 1984–85, 1995–96, 2007–08: 3
Connacht Senior League Challenge Cup
Winners: 1998–99: 1
Runners Up: 1986–87, 1993–94: 2
Connacht Junior Cup
Winners: 1957–58: 1
Runners Up: 1946–47: 1

References

External links
Galway United FC Official Website
Galway United FC on Facebook
Galway United FC on Twitter
Galway United FC on YouTube
Galway United FC on Instagram
The Galway United Forum
Galway United FC on Soccerway

 
Association football clubs in County Galway
League of Ireland First Division clubs
Association football clubs in Galway (city)
Former League of Ireland Premier Division clubs